Phyllonorycter trojana is a moth of the family Gracillariidae. It is known from Montenegro, North Macedonia and Greece.

The larvae feed on Quercus trojana. They mine the leaves of their host plant. They create a small lower-surface tentiform mine with one strong fold. The roof is completely eaten out most of the time. The cocoon is located in the mine and the frass is scattered around it in a horse-shoe like shape.

References

trojana
Moths of Europe
Moths described in 1982